Shurakat-e Jonubi Rural District is in Ilkhchi District of Osku County, East Azerbaijan province, Iran. At the National Census of 2006, its population was 10,307 in 2,644 households. There were 11,627 inhabitants in 3,275 households at the following census of 2011. At the most recent census of 2016, the population of the rural district was 11,745 in 3,621 households. The largest of its 17 villages was Kordlar, with 2,818 people.

References 

Osku County

Rural Districts of East Azerbaijan Province

Populated places in East Azerbaijan Province

Populated places in Osku County